Taczanowski's ground tyrant (Muscisaxicola griseus) or the plain-capped ground tyrant, is a species of bird in the family Tyrannidae.
It is found in Bolivia and Peru.
Its natural habitat is subtropical or tropical high-altitude grassland.

Gallery

References

Taczanowski's ground tyrant
Birds of the Puna grassland
Taczanowski's ground tyrant
Taczanowski's ground tyrant
Taxonomy articles created by Polbot